Backwoods Bunny is a 1959 Warner Bros. Merrie Melodies cartoon, directed by Robert McKimson and written by Tedd Pierce. The short was released on June 13, 1959, and stars Bugs Bunny. Voiced by Mel Blanc, Bugs Bunny takes a vacation in the Ozarks, but he is pursued by two famished buzzards, voiced by Daws Butler (uncredited.)

Plot
Bugs Bunny arrives in the Ozarks, just his sort of place for vacation. But in a small cottage placed atop a tall bare tree lives a bumpkin buzzard and his son Elvis. Elvis spots Bugs and decides to lure him with a carrot. Bugs of course notices his attempt from a tree stump.
Bugs puts his hand out to feel the carrot long enough to lure Elvis to the hole entrance, and Elvis pulls out of the hand which turns out to be a long hose with a white glove on the end of it. Bugs turn on the water tap sends Elvis back and forth between two trees, until Bugs turns off the water and Elvis falls to the ground. Bugs asks Elvis what is going to with the snake. Elvis panics and flies off toward the cottage and comes back with a rifle. When Bugs tells him there are no snakes, Elvis points his rifle at Bugs and shoots, but misses. Bugs inches closer and Elvis, exclaiming "I'll blow your flunkin' head off!", backs away until he falls off a cliff.

As Elvis starts to have another go at Bugs, he falls for Bugs dressed as a pretty hillbilly lady. Very soon, however, he realises it's Bugs and shoots at him, Bugs diving into his rabbit hole. Elvis points his rifle in the hole and demands Bugs come out. Bugs refuses. As Elvis gives Bugs the count of four, Bugs attaches some pipes from the end of the rifle to where the father buzzard is lounging in his cottage. After the countdown is up, Elvis shoots his father in the face. A misunderstanding makes Elvis shoot his father repeatedly, the continuity made by Bugs, dressed for golf, singing the Art Mooney tune "I'm Lookin' Over a Four (BANG!) Leaf Clover That I Overlooked Before (BANG!) Fore... (BANG!) Fore... (BANG!) Fore... (BANG!)".

Music
 "I'm Looking Over a Four-Leaf Clover", (uncredited). Music by Harry M. Woods, Lyrics by Mort Dixon
 "Arkansas Traveler", (uncredited). Music by Sanford Faulkner
 "Oh, You Beautiful Doll", (uncredited). Music by Nat Ayer

References

External links
 

1959 films
1959 animated films
1959 short films
Merrie Melodies short films
Warner Bros. Cartoons animated short films
Films directed by Robert McKimson
1950s English-language films
Films scored by Milt Franklyn
Bugs Bunny films
1950s Warner Bros. animated short films
Films set in the Ozarks
Films about vacationing